The National Student Media Awards or Smedias are an annual All-Ireland student journalism competition run by the Oxygen.ie website. The awards have been labelled "Ireland's premier student awards".

History and format
Since 2000, Oxygen.ie, a website aimed at third-level students, has run a student journalism competition.

, submissions are invited in a number of categories. These included Editor of the Year (previously won by UCD's University Observer), Magazine of the Year (previously won by DCU's Flux), Newspaper of the Year (including previous winners The University Times, Trinity News, and University Observer), Sports Writer of the Year (previously won by The College View), and Website of the Year (previously won by Sin.ie).

Judges
Judges have included:
 Geraldine Kennedy, Editor of The Irish Times
 Ruth Scott, 2fm DJ 
 Cathal Ó Searcaigh, Member of Aosdána
 Jason Sherlock, Winner of GAA GPA All Stars Awards
 Benjamin Cleary, Oscar winning filmmaker
 Paul Howard, journalist and author

References

External links

Student newspapers published in Ireland
Journalism awards
Irish awards
Student media awards
Awards established in 2000